The crunch is an abdominal exercise that works the rectus abdominis muscle. It enables both building "six-pack" abs and tightening the belly. Crunches use the exerciser's own body weight to tone muscle and are recommended by some experts, despite negative research results, as a low-cost exercise that can be performed at home. According to experts like Canadian biomechanics researcher Stuart McGill, crunches are less effective than other exercises such as planks and carry risk of back injury.

Form

The biomechanics professor Stuart McGill was quoted in The New York Times Health blog as stating:

An approved crunch begins with you lying down, one knee bent, and hands positioned beneath your lower back for support. "Do not hollow your stomach or press your back against the floor", McGill says. Gently lift your head and shoulders, hold briefly and relax back down.

McGill's further research however showed that both sit-ups and crunches are mediocre strength-building exercises and actually hurt many people.

In a crunch, unlike a sit-up, the lower back stays on the floor. This is said to eliminate any involvement by the hip flexors, and make the crunch an effective isolation exercise for the abdominals.

See also

 Plank (exercise)
 Sit-up

References

External links

Bodyweight exercises
Strength training
Physical exercise